Sex Cymbal is the fourth solo album from Sheila E. released on June 15, 1991 by Warner Bros. Records, four years after Sheila E.'s previous album. It is her first album that does not feature any input from her mentor Prince.

History
In 1990 Sheila went into the studio to record the album with her brother Peter Michael. She and Michael produced the whole album together and a few songs feature co-production from David Gamson and J.P. Charles.

Sex Cymbal produced three singles, "Sex Cymbal", "Droppin' Like Flies", and "Cry Baby". The title track, which included an intro with a brief sample of "The Glamorous Life,"  was released as the lead single, and it reached the top 40 of the R&B and Dance charts. The second single, "Droppin' Like Flies", was a top 40 Dance hit but stalled at #77 on the R&B charts. The third and final single from the album, "Cry Baby", failed to chart.

The album is a departure from her previous album Sheila E., which was notable for its Latin influence and mixing many styles of music such as jazz, rock, funk, R&B, and salsa. It has a very prominent house- and dance-focused sound that was popular in the late 1980s and the early 1990s.

Track listing
Produced and arranged by Sheila E. and Peter Michael except where noted.
 "Sex Cymbal" – 4:26
 "Funky Attitude" – 5:11
 "Leader of the Band" – 4:04
 "Cry Baby" – 5:44 (Sheila E., J.P. Charles)
 "Lady Marmalade" – 5:04 (Bob Crewe, Kenny Nolan)
 "808 Kate (Drum Solo)" – 1:00
 "Loverboy" – 4:03
 "Mother Mary" – 5:23
 "Droppin' Like Flies" – 5:26 (Peter Michael, David Gamson)
 "What'cha Gonna Do" – 4:40
 "Private Party (Tu Para Mi)" – 4:39
 "Family Affair (Percussion Jam)" – 1:00
 "Promise Me Love" – 5:37
 "Heaven" – 4:36

Chart positions

Personnel
Sheila E. – lead vocals, production
Michael Peter – production
J.P. Charles – co-production on "Cry Baby"
David Gamson – co-production on "Droppin' Like Flies"

References

External links
 

Sheila E. albums
1991 albums
Warner Records albums